Michael Lee Meredith (born April 25, 1985) is an American politician and a Republican member of the Kentucky House of Representatives representing District 19 since January 4, 2011.

Education
Meredith earned his BS in business management from Western Kentucky University.

Elections
2012 Meredith and former Democratic Representative Sims both won their May 22, 2012 primaries, setting up a rematch, but Sims withdrew, leaving Meredith unopposed for the November 6, 2012 General election, winning with 12,770 votes.
2010 To challenge District 19 incumbent Democratic Representative Dottie Sims, Meredith won the May 18, 2010 Republican Primary with 3,017 votes (75.9%) and won the November 2, 2010 General election with 8,368 votes (58.0%) against Representative Sims.

References

External links
Official page at the Kentucky General Assembly

Michael Meredith at Ballotpedia
Michael Lee Meredith at OpenSecrets

Place of birth missing (living people)
1985 births
Living people
Republican Party members of the Kentucky House of Representatives
People from Brownsville, Kentucky
Western Kentucky University alumni
21st-century American politicians